The Flame may refer to:

Films
 The Flame (1920 film), a 1920 British film directed by Floyd Martin Thornton
 The Flame (1923 film), English title for a 1923 German film titled Die Flamme
 The Flame (1947 film), a 1947 film directed by John H. Auer
 The Flame, English title for a 1952 Italian film titled La fiammata
Songs
 "The Flame" (Arcadia song), a 1986 song by British band Arcadia
 "The Flame" (Cheap Trick song), a 1988 song by American band Cheap Trick
 "The Flame", a 1996 song by British band Fine Young Cannibals
 "The Flame", the official song of the 2000 Sydney Summer Olympics performed by Tina Arena
Albums
 The Flame (The Flames album), a 1970 album by South-African Band The Flames
 The Flame (Steve Lacy album), a 1982 album by American jazz saxophonist Steve Lacy
 The Flame (Annabel Lamb album), a 1984 album by British singer Annabel Lamb
 The Flame (Gina Jeffreys album), a 1994 album by Australian singer Gina Jeffreys
 The Flame (Dover album), a 2003 album by Spanish rock band Dover
Print media
 The Flame (novel), a 1900 novel by Gabriele D'Annunzio
 The FLAME, a Seventh-day Adventist magazine
 The Flame, a newspaper of the British National Front
 The Flame, a student newspaper of the University of Houston–Victoria
 The Flame (poetry collection), a 2018 poetry collection by Leonard Cohen 
Other
 The Flame (DHARMA Initiative), a fictional research project station featured in the American television series Lost
 Flame (comics), a fictional superhero character
 The Flame (wrestler), a ring name of wrestler Jody Hamilton
 The Flame, a piece of AI from The 100

See also
 Flacăra (disambiguation)
 Flame (disambiguation)